The 42nd Directors Guild of America Awards, honoring the outstanding directorial achievements in film and television in 1989, were presented on March 10, 1990 at the Beverly Hilton and in New York City. The feature film nominees were announced on January 30, 1990 and nominees in six television categories were announced on February 8, 1990.

Winners and nominees

Film

Television

Commercials

D.W. Griffith Award
 Ingmar Bergman

Frank Capra Achievement Award
 Stanley Ackerman

Robert B. Aldrich Service Award
 George Schaefer

Honorary Life Member
 Barry Diller
 Elliot Silverstein
 Sidney Sheinberg

References

External links
 

Directors Guild of America Awards
1989 film awards
1989 television awards
Direct
Direct
Directors
1990 in Los Angeles
1990 in New York City
March 1990 events in the United States